Rose ffrench, 1st Baroness ffrench (died 8 December 1805), was an Irish peeress.

The eldest daughter of Patrick Dillon of Roscommon, she married on 25 June 1761 Sir Charles ffrench, 1st Baronet (cr.1779), who was later Mayor of Galway. He died in 1784.

In 1798, Lady ffrench was created Baroness ffrench, of Castle ffrench, County Galway, in recognition of the services of her son, Sir Thomas ffrench, 2nd Bt., who was a member of the Catholic Committee. Because she was nominally Protestant, the creation was in keeping with King George III's objection to elevating Catholics to the peerage. Upon her decease, her Catholic son Sir Thomas inherited the barony.

The title and the family name are both spelled with a lower-case double-'f'.

References
 Burke's Peerage & Gentry, 107th edition

Year of birth unknown
1805 deaths
Barons in the Peerage of Ireland
Hereditary peeresses of Ireland created by George III
People from County Roscommon
People from County Galway
19th-century Irish women
18th-century Irish people
19th-century Irish people
18th-century Irish women